Villanueva de Tapia is a town and municipality in the Province of Málaga, part of the autonomous community of Andalusia in southern Spain. It is located in the comarca of Antequera. The municipality is situated approximately 67 kilometres from Málaga. It has a population of approximately 1,700 residents. The natives are called Tapienses or Entricheros.

References

Municipalities in the Province of Málaga